Benjamin Graydon Allmark (June 1, 1911 – January 4, 2004) was a Canadian politician, planning supervisor and superintendent. He was elected to the House of Commons of Canada as a member of the Progressive Conservatives for the riding of Kingston in the 1958 election and defeated in the 1962 election. He had a seat in the house of commons for the 24th Canadian Parliament, when John Diefenbaker was prime minister.

He worked as a sailor for Canada Steamship Lines for 11 years, rising to first mate. He was an alderman for Kingston City Council before that. Then at the Kingston operations of Alcan becoming a manager.

Allmark moved to Victoria, British Columbia in 1976. He died there in 2004, aged 92.

References

External links

1911 births
2004 deaths
Kingston, Ontario city councillors
Members of the House of Commons of Canada from Ontario
Progressive Conservative Party of Canada MPs